The Board of Intermediate and Secondary Education, Rajshahi is an autonomous organization, mainly responsible for holding two public examinations (SSC & HSC). The Board started its operation in the year 1961.

Background

Board of Intermediate and Secondary Education, Rajshahi was founded in the year 1961, which led to creation of a separate education zone in the northern Bangladesh (erstwhile East Pakistan) from administrative and educational control of the Dhaka Education Board at the Secondary and Intermediate level of education. The Governor (of East Pakistan) was promulgated the ordinance of 1961 vide no. XXXIII-1961 (and its amendments No. XVI of 1962 and No. XVII of 1977), called the Intermediate and Secondary Education Ordinance 1961. The board's jurisdiction is Rajshahi Division.

Purpose

The board is responsible for organization, regulation, supervision, control and development of intermediate and secondary education, holding public examinations, both Secondary School Certificate and Higher Secondary School Certificate. As an important agency of the government, board's purpose is multiple and widespread in rationalizing the vision of the govt.'s educational policy and ensuring its implementation within its assigned jurisdiction.

District under Rajshahi Education Board
Bogra District
Chapai Nawabganj District
Joypurhat District
Naogaon District
Natore District
Pabna District
Rajshahi District
Sirajganj District

See also
 List of colleges affiliated with Rajshahi Education Board
List of Intermediate and Secondary Education Boards in Bangladesh

References

External links
 Official website
 Education Boards of Bangladesh
 Directorate of Secondary and Higher Education in Bangladesh

Education in Rajshahi
Education Board in Bangladesh
Government boards of Bangladesh